The South African Railways Class C2 4-6-4T of 1896 was a steam locomotive from the pre-Union era in the Colony of Natal.

Between 1879 and 1885, the Natal Government Railways placed 37  tank steam locomotives in service, which were later designated Class G. In 1896, one of them was rebuilt to the first known  Baltic type locomotive, later designated Class H. In 1912, when this rebuilt engine was assimilated into the South African Railways, it was renumbered and became its only  locomotive.

Manufacturers
The Natal Government Railways (NGR) Class G  tank locomotives, sometimes known as the K&S Class after their builders, Kitson and Stephenson, were delivered between 1879 and 1884. They had plate frames and used Stephenson valve gear.

Rebuilding
On 1 July 1896, George William Reid succeeded William Milne as Locomotive Superintendent of the NGR. Later in that year, he rebuilt one of the Stephenson-built batch of locomotives of 1882, no. 21, to a  wheel arrangement. In the process, the frame had to be extended to accommodate the trailing bogie and the coal bunker could be enlarged.

The locomotive was rebuilt for use in shuttle service on the South Coast line where, at the time, no turntable or triangle was available at the terminus. The modification was done to enable the locomotive to run equally well chimney or bunker forward.

As rebuilt, the locomotive was still equipped with both Salter and Ramsbottom safety valves. Contemporary photographs show that the Salter safety valves were later removed.

This locomotive was the first known in the world to have a  Baltic type wheel arrangement. Photographs show the rebuilt locomotive bearing NGR no. 1. The NGR later renumbered it to no. 39, but it remained known as a K&S type in NGR service until a classification system was introduced at some stage between 1904 and 1908, when it was designated .

It had an  longer wheelbase and was  longer over the couplers.

South African Railways
When the Union of South Africa was established on 31 May 1910, the three Colonial government railways (Cape Government Railways, NGR and Central South African Railways) were united under a single administration to control and administer the railways, ports and harbours of the Union. Although the South African Railways and Harbours came into existence in 1910, the actual classification and renumbering of all the rolling stock of the three constituent railways were only implemented with effect from 1 January 1912.

In 1912, this locomotive became the sole Class C2 engine on the South African Railways and was renumbered 86.

Service
The Class C2 remained in use on branch line work on the South Coast line and was later relegated to shunting work. It was withdrawn from service in 1931.

Illustration

References

1080
1080
4-6-4 locomotives
2C2 locomotives
4-6-4T locomotives
Robert Stephenson and Company locomotives
NGR shop-built locomotives
Cape gauge railway locomotives
Railway locomotives introduced in 1896
1896 in South Africa
Scrapped locomotives